Ebony was a New Zealand duo music band, best known for their 1974 hit "Big Norm", about New Zealand Prime Minister Norman Kirk.

References

New Zealand rock music groups